The International Leaders Programme (ILP) is an international leadership development and networking programme. The programme is organised and delivered by the Foreign, Commonwealth and Development Office of the Government of the United Kingdom. The ILP is not to be confused by programmes of a similar name provided by other organisations.

Background 
The ILP was established in March 2013 by former Foreign Secretary William Hague. It identifies potential global leaders of the future and brings them to the United Kingdom for high-level meetings, briefings, and diplomatic visits. The goal of the programme is to promote lasting global partnerships with emerging leaders and future decision-makers.

ILP participants have represented 100 countries, and the alumni has over 350 members to date.

Notable participants 
Participants in the programme have included:

 Ilwad Elman, Somalia
 Bogolo Kenewendo, Botswana
 Naheed Nenshi, Canada

References

External links 

 International Leaders Programme - Official Website

Organizations established in 2013
Foreign, Commonwealth and Development Office
International organizations based in Europe